The discography of British-Australian pop singer Peter Andre contains eleven studio albums, three compilation albums and twenty eight singles. Andre has sales of over 920,000 albums and 1.4 million singles in the UK, making his total UK sales 2,320,000 according to the BPI. His current Australian sales stand at over 1,000,000.

Peter Andre, Andre's debut album, was released on 28 November 1993. The album reached No. 27 on the Australian Albums Chart. "Drive Me Crazy", was released in Australia in 1992 as the lead single from the album. The album also includes the singles "Gimme Little Sign", "Funky Junky", "Let's Get It On / Do You Wanna Dance?" and "To the Top". Natural, Andre's second studio album, was released on 30 September 1996, and topped the UK Albums Chart. The album included the hit single "Mysterious Girl", which peaked at No. 2 on the UK Singles Chart. The album also includes the singles "Turn It Up", "Only One", "Get Down on It", "Flava", "I Feel You" and "Natural". Time, Andre's third studio album, was released on 17 November 1997, peaking at number 28 on the UK Albums Chart. The album includes the singles "All About Us", "Lonely" and "All Night, All Right". The Long Road Back, Andre's fourth studio album, was released on 7 June 2004, peaking at number 44 on the UK Albums Chart. He re-released his 1995 single "Mysterious Girl" it peaked at No. 1 on the UK Singles Chart. The album also includes the singles "Insania" and "The Right Way".

A Whole New World, Andre's fifth studio album, was released on 27 November 2006, peaking at number 20 on the UK Albums Chart. He released the album with his former wife, English model and celebrity Katie Price. Revelation, Andre's sixth studio album, was released on 14 September 2009, peaking at number 3 on the UK Albums Chart. "Behind Closed Doors" was released as the lead single from the album in August 2009, reaching number 4 on the UK Singles Chart. "Unconditional" was released as the second single from the album in November 2009. Accelerate, Andre's seventh studio album, was released on 1 November 2010, debuting at number 10 on the UK Albums Chart. It marked a new urban direction for Andre. "Defender" was released as the lead single from the album in October 2010, achieving a number 14 peak on the UK Singles Chart. "Perfect Night" was released as the second single from the album in July 2011, peaking at number 48 on the UK Singles Chart. Angels & Demons, Andre's eighth studio album, was released on 29 October 2012 and reached number 18 on the UK Albums Chart. "Bad As You Are" was released as the lead single from the album on 22 October 2012. Big Night, Andre's ninth studio album, was released on 26 May 2014, peaking at number 23 on the UK Albums Chart. "Kid" was released as the lead single from the album on 9 February 2014, reaching number 144 on the UK Singles Chart. The song was chosen for the DreamWorks animated movie Mr. Peabody & Sherman and was also used in the Autumn Iceland TV commercials. "Big Night" was released as the second single from the album on 13 April 2014. White Christmas, Andre's tenth studio album, was released on 21 November 2014. Come Fly with Me, Andre's eleventh studio album, was released on 15 October 2015. The album debuted at No. 5 on the UK Albums Chart.

Albums

Studio albums

Compilation albums

Singles

As lead artist

References

External links
 Peter Andre official website

Discographies of Australian artists
Discographies of British artists
Pop music discographies
Peter Andre